Emperor Nader Shah, the Shah of Iran (1736–1747) and the founder of the Afsharid dynasty, invaded Northern India, eventually attacking Delhi in March 1739. His army had easily defeated the Mughals at the Battle of Karnal and would eventually capture the Mughal capital in the aftermath of the battle.

Nader Shah's victory against the weak and crumbling Mughal Empire in the far east meant that he could afford to turn back and resume war against Persia's archrival, the neighbouring Ottoman Empire, but also the further campaigns in the North Caucasus and Central Asia.

Prelude 

Nader Shah became the ruler of Afsharid Iran in 1730. His troops captured Esfahan from the Safavid dynasty and founded the Afsharid dynasty in that year. In 1738, Nader Shah conquered Kandahar, the last outpost of the Hotaki dynasty in Afghanistan, he then began to launch raids across the Hindu Kush mountains into Northern India, which, at that time, was under the rule of the Mughal Empire. As he moved into the Mughal territories, he was loyally accompanied by his Georgian subject and future king of eastern Georgia, Erekle II, who led a Georgian contingent as a military commander as part of Nader's force.

The Mughal empire was weakened by several wars in the three decades following the death of Aurangzeb. The Marathas had captured vast swathes of territory in Central and Northern India, whilst many of the Mughal nobles had asserted their independence and founded small states. The Mughal ruler, Muhammad Shah, proved unable to stop the disintegration of the empire. The defenses in Afghanistan, especially, were weak after tribal uprisings by the Pashtuns on the Northern Frontier. The imperial court administration was corrupt and weak. Nader Shah, attracted by the country's wealth, sought plunder like so many other foreign invaders before him. Delhi was one of the richest capitals in the world at the time. Of the three great Muslim realms in the 18th century, the Ottoman, the Persian, and the Mughal, the Mughal was the most affluent and splendid.

Nader had asked Muhammad Shah to close the Mughal frontiers around Kabul so that the Afghan rebels he was fighting against could not seek refuge in Kabul. Even though the Emperor agreed, he practically took no action. The Delhi Court excused itself on the ground of its pre-occupation with the "Deccan infidels" and repeated its assurances. Nader seized upon this as a pretext for war. Prior to embarking on his campaign, Nader more or less sacked Isfahan for money and provisions for his army. Together with his Georgian subject Erekle II (Heraclius II), who took part in the expedition as a commander leading a contingent of Georgian troops, he began marching into Mughal territory on 10 May 1738. Before entering India, Nader Shah also kept up the pretence that his motive was to save the Mughal empire from the Marathas.

Invasions
Nader Shah crossed Mughal territory at the Mukhur spring and halted at Qarabagh, south of Ghazni.  A detachment was sent under Nader's son, Nasrullah, to attack the Afghans of Ghorband and Bamian. When the governor of Ghazni fled upon hearing of Nader's approach, the Qadi, Scholars, and rich men of Ghazni gave the invaders presents and submitted to Nader when he entered on 31 May. Meanwhile, the other detachment had defeated the Afghans, pardoning all who surrendered, and exacting cruel punishment on those who resisted.

With his flank secure, Nader was free to march on Kabul. The chief men of the city tried to give in peacefully, but Sharza Khan decided to give resistance. On 10 June, Nader reached the city and the garrison sallied out to try and attack the Persians, who then just retreated to a safe distance where they could besiege the city.  Nader arrived on the 11th and surveyed the city's defenses from atop the Black Rock.  The garrison tried to attack again, but were driven out by the Persian army. The city was besieged for a week until on 19 June, the tower of Aqa-bin collapsed, and the citadel capitulated.

Nader settled down in Kabul to handle the province's affairs. He received word that the Mughal Emperor would not receive Nader's letter to him, nor would he let his ambassador leave.  In response, he sent an envoy to the imperial court, and expresses that his only wish is to do the Mughals a favor and rid them of the Afghans; how they have done more damage to India, and that the Kabul garrison's hostility forced him to fight them. The envoy sent to deliver the letter was turned back at Jalalabad, and then murdered by a neighboring chieftain.

While this was going on, Nader left Kabul due to lack of supplies and started for Gandamak on 25 August. The Afsharids reached Jalalabad and sacked the city on 7 September in revenge for the murder of Nader's courier. Nader sent his son, Reza to Iran (3 November).

Conquest of Punjab 
On 6 November, the march through India was resumed. Nasir Khan, the Mughal governor of Afghanistan, was in Peshawar when he heard of Nader Shah's invasion. He hastily assembled some 20,000 poorly-trained tribal levies that would be no match for Nader's veteran soldiery. Nader marched rapidly through the steep path and outflanked the Mughal army at the Khyber Pass and annihilated it. Three days after the battle, Nader occupied Peshawar without resistance.

On 12 December, they resumed marching.  They built a bridge over the Indus river by Attock and crossed the Chenab near Wazirabad on 8 January 1739. In the Battle of Karnal on 24 February 1739, Nader led his army to victory over the Mughals. Muhammad Shah surrendered and both entered Delhi together. The keys to the capital of Delhi were surrendered to Nader. He entered the city on 20 March 1739. The next day, the Shah (Nader Shah) held a durbar in Delhi.

Massacre
The Afsharid occupation led to price increases in the city. The city administrator attempted to fix prices at a lower level and Afsharid troops were sent to the market at Paharganj, Delhi to enforce them. However, the local merchants refused to accept the lower prices and this resulted in violence during which some Afsharid troops were assaulted and killed.

When a rumour spread that Nader had been assassinated by a female guard at the Red Fort, some Indians attacked and killed 3,000 Afsharid troops during the riots that broke out on the night of 21 March. Nader, furious at the killings, retaliated by ordering his soldiers to carry out the notorious qatl-e-aam (massacre – qatl = killing, aam = common public, in open) of Delhi.

On the morning of 22 March, the Shah sat at Sunehri Masjid of Roshan-ud-Daulah. He then, to the accompaniment of the rolling of drums and the blaring of trumpets, unsheathed his great battle sword in a grand flourish to the great and loud acclaim and wild cheers of the Afsharid troops present. This was the signal to start the onslaught and carnage. Almost immediately, the fully armed Afsharid army of occupation turned their swords and guns on to the unarmed and defenceless civilians in the city. The Afsharid soldiers were given full licence to do as they pleased and promised a share of the wealth as the city was plundered.

Areas of Delhi such as Chandni Chowk and Dariba Kalan, Fatehpuri, Faiz Bazar, Hauz Kazi, Johri Bazar and the Lahori, Ajmeri and Kabuli gates, all of which were densely populated by both Hindus and Muslims, were soon covered with corpses.  Muslims, like Hindus, resorted to killing their women, children and themselves rather than submit to the Afsharid soldiers.

In the words of the Tazkira:

Muhammad Shah was forced to beg for mercy. These horrific events were recorded in contemporary chronicles such as the Tarikh-e-Hindi of Rustam Ali, the Bayan-e-Waqai of Abdul Karim and the Tazkira of Anand Ram Mukhlis.

Finally, after many hours of desperate pleading by the Mughals for mercy, Nader Shah relented and signalled a halt to the bloodshed by sheathing his battle sword once again.

Casualties
It has been estimated that during the course of six hours in one day, 22 March 1739, approximately 20,000 to 30,000 Indian men, women and children were slaughtered by the Afsharid troops during the massacre in the city.  Exact casualty figures are uncertain, as after the massacre, the bodies of the victims were simply buried in mass burial pits or cremated in grand funeral pyres without any proper record being made of the numbers cremated or buried. In addition, some 10,000 women and children were taken slaves, according to a representative of the Dutch East India Company in Delhi.

Plunder

The city was sacked for several days. An enormous fine of 20 million rupees was levied on the people of Delhi. Muhammad Shah handed over the keys to the royal treasury, and lost the Peacock Throne, to Nader Shah, which thereafter served as a symbol of Persian imperial might. Amongst a treasure trove of other fabulous jewels, Nader also gained the Koh-i-Noor and Darya-i-Noor ("Mountain of Light" and "Sea of Light", respectively) diamonds; they are now part of the British and Iranian Crown Jewels, respectively. Nader and his Afsharid troops left Delhi in the beginning of May 1739, but before they left, he ceded back all territories to the east of the Indus, which he had overrun, to Muhammad Shah. The sack of the city and defeat of the Mughals was made easier since both parties were originally from Persian cultures.

Aftermath 

On Nader's return to Iran, Sikhs fell upon his army and seized a large amount of booty and freed the slaves in captivity and Nader's army could not pursue them successfully as they were oppressed by the terrible heat of May, and being overloaded with booty. But, still the plunder seized from Delhi was so much that Nader stopped taxation in Persia for a period of three years following his return. The governor of Sindh did not comply with Nader Shah's demands. Nader Shah's victory against the crumbling Mughal Empire in the East meant that he could afford to turn to the West and face the Ottomans. The Ottoman Sultan Mahmud I initiated the Ottoman–Persian War (1743–1746), in which Muhammad Shah closely cooperated with the Ottomans until his death in 1748. According to Axworthy, Nader's Indian campaign alerted the East India Company to the extreme weakness of the Mughal Empire and the possibility of expanding to fill the power vacuum. Axworthy claims that without Nader, "eventual British rule in India would have come later and in a different form, perhaps never at all – with important global effects". 

Nader's son, Nasrollah, married a Mughal princess after the sack.

Notes

References 

 Sources
 
 
 Jadunath Sarkar, Nader Shah in India 110 Pages (1925) Book from the Archaeological Survey of India Central Archaeological Library, New Delhi

Further reading
 
 Jassa Singh Ahluwalia:The Forgotten Hero of Punjab by Harish Dhillon
 Grant, RG: Battle
 (Nader Shah) Until His Assassination In A.D. 1747. A Literary History of Persia by Edward G. Browne. Publisher T. Fisher Unwin, 1924.

Conflicts in 1738
Conflicts in 1739
1739 in India
18th century in Delhi
1730s in the Mughal Empire
Invasions of India
Wars involving the Mughal Empire
Wars involving Afsharid Iran